Aegeofusinus profetai is a species of sea snail, a marine gastropod mollusk in the family Fasciolariidae, the spindle snails, the tulip snails and their allies.

Description
The shell size varies between 10 mm and 14 mm

Distribution
This species occurs in European waters and in the Mediterranean Sea off Spain and Greece.

References

 Nofroni I. (1982). Fusinus profetai, new species from the Mediterranean. La Conchiglia 154-155: 8-9 page(s): p.8-9 
 Buzzurro G. & Russo P. (2007). Fusinus del Mediterraneo. published by the authors, 280 p.
 Russo P. (2017). New genus Aegeofusinus (Gastropoda: Fasciolariidae) to include small endemic species of the Aegean sea. Bollettino Malacologico. 53: 63-68

External links
 

profetai
Gastropods described in 1982